The 2022 Currie Cup First Division was the 84th edition of the Currie Cup. As the second-tier of the competition, it ran alongside the 2022 Currie Cup Premier Division. It was sponsored by beer brand Carling Black Label and organised by the South African Rugby Union.

The tournament was played from April to June in a single round-robin format, following the realignment of the South African domestic rugby union calendar to dovetail with the northern hemisphere and the United Rugby Championship, which features four South African sides.

The competition again featured ten sides, the seven sides who competed in the 2021 Currie Cup First Division, and teams from Georgia, Kenya and Zimbabwe. The top South African side in the 2022 Currie Cup First Division was promoted to the Premier Division for 2023, forming an eight team competition. The 2022 Currie Cup Premier Division began in January and was completed in June.

Teams

The ten competing teams are:

Regular season

Standings

Tournament points in the standings were awarded to teams as follows:
 4 points for a win.
 2 points for a draw. 
 1 bonus point for a loss in a match by seven points or under. 
 1 bonus point for scoring four tries or more.

Teams were ranked in the standings firstly by tournament points then by: (a) points difference from all matches (points scored less points conceded); (b) tries difference from all matches (tries scored less tries conceded); (c) points difference from the matches between the tied teams; (d) points scored in all matches; (e) tries scored in all matches; and, if needed, (f) a coin toss.

Round-by-round
The table below shows the progression of all teams throughout the Currie Cup season. Each team's tournament points on the standings log is shown for each round, with the overall log position in brackets.

Matches

Listed below are all matches for the round-robin, played for the 2022 Currie Cup First Division.

Round 1

Round 2

Round 3

Round 4

Round 5

Round 6

Round 7

Round 8

Round 9

Round 10

Play-offs

Semifinals

Final

Players

Team rosters

The respective team squads for the 2022 Currie Cup First Division are:

Referees
The following referees officiated matches in the competition:

See also
 2022 Currie Cup Premier Division

Notes

References

2022 Currie Cup
2022
Currie Cup 2022
Currie Cup 2022